All Directions is a 1972 album by The Temptations for the Gordy (Motown) label, produced by Norman Whitfield. It reached number two on the Billboard 200, making it the band's most successful non-collaborative album on the chart, and became their twelfth album to reach number one on the Top R&B Albums chart.

Overview and background
The LP features the #1 hit "Papa Was a Rollin' Stone", a twelve-minute cover of a Whitfield-produced Undisputed Truth single. "Papa" won three Grammy Awards in 1973: Best R&B Performance by a Group for the Temptations, Best R&B Instrumental Performance for Whitfield and arranger/conductor Paul Riser's instrumental version of "Papa" on the single's b-side, and Best R&B Song for Whitfield and lyricist Barrett Strong. All Directions was Strong's final LP as the Temptations' lyricist; Strong in fact had no direct involvement in the album as both of his compositions for it – "Papa was a Rollin' Stone" and "Funky Music Sho' 'Nuff Turns Me On", were both covers (originally by The Undisputed Truth and Edwin Starr, respectively). Strong left Motown to restart his career as a recording artist.

According to group leader Otis Williams, the Temptations fought "tooth and nail" not to record "Papa Was a Rollin' Stone" or "Run Charlie Run", a socially conscious Black power track (dealing primarily with the phenomenon of white flight) that called for them to repeatedly call out, in an affected Caucasian accent, "the niggers are comin'!" According to legend, lead singer Dennis Edwards didn't want to sing "Papa's" opening lines, because his own father had died on the third of September, but in actuality, Edwards' father had died on the third of October. In addition, his father was a minister, "a good, steady, religious man", not a "rolling stone".

The group was certain that "Papa" and All Directions would flop, and that they would be back to singing ballads like "My Girl" and "Ain't Too Proud to Beg" again. Although the first single, "Mother Nature", charted at number 92 on the Billboard Pop Singles Chart, "Papa" was a number one hit and is today one of the Temptations' signature songs.

Also included on All Directions are the Edwin Starr cover "Funky Music Sho' 'Nuff Turns Me On" (the b-side to "Mother Nature", a Top 30 R&B hit), the Marvin Gaye & Tammi Terrell cover "Love Woke Me Up This Morning", and "I Ain't Got Nothin'", a rare lead showcase for Otis Williams.

Legacy
The album was included in the book 1001 Albums You Must Hear Before You Die.

Track listing

Personnel
 Dennis Edwards – vocals
 Damon Harris – vocals
 Richard Street – vocals
 Melvin Franklin – vocals
 Otis Williams – vocals
 The Andantes – additional background vocals on "Love Woke Me Up This Morning"
 Norman Whitfield – producer
 The Funk Brothers – instrumentation
 Billy Cooper, Joe Messina, Melvin Ragin (aka Wah Wah Watson), Robert Ward, Paul Warren, Robert White, Eddie Willis – guitars
 Richard "Pistol" Allen, Uriel Jones, Aaron Smith, Andrew Smith – drums
 Earl Van Dyke – piano
 Johnny Griffith – organ
 Bob Babbitt, James Jamerson, Leroy Taylor – bass
 Jack Ashford – tambourine, maracas, sticks, etc.
 Jack Brokensha – timpani, vibes, bells, gourd
 Eddie "Bongo" Brown – bongo, conga
 Maurice Davis – trumpet

Charts

Weekly charts

Year-end charts

Singles

References

See also
List of number-one R&B albums of 1972 (U.S.)

1972 albums
The Temptations albums
Gordy Records albums
Albums produced by Norman Whitfield
Albums recorded at Hitsville U.S.A.